Elise Mertens was the two-time defending champion but chose to compete in Sydney instead. Sofia Kenin won her first WTA Tour singles title without dropping a set. She defeated Anna Karolína Schmiedlová in the final, 6–3, 6–0.

Seeds

Draw

Finals

Top half

Bottom half

Qualifying

Seeds

Qualifiers

Lucky losers

Qualifying draw

First qualifier

Second qualifier

Third qualifier

Fourth qualifier

Fifth qualifier

Sixth qualifier

References

External links
 Main draw
 Qualifying draw

Hobart International
Singles